The 1955 NASCAR Grand National season began on November 7, 1954, and ended on October 30, 1955. Even though the season was resolved in the course of two different years, all NASCAR personnel were allowed to have their traditional two-month silly season that traditionally comes between mid-November and mid-February. Tim Flock won the 1955 championship by a margin of 1508 over top of Buck Baker. This season was unusual because of its 11-month season (as opposed to the current 10-month season format). As the ninth season of the series now known as the Cup Series, most of the drivers involved were still the first-generation race car drivers. They did not have any ties to the stock car racing world through their parents or grandparents although some of them served in World War II prior to their NASCAR careers. However, the generation that would gain notoriety and fame through nepotism (i.e., their father or older brother having a ride before them) would emerge about ten years later. The average horsepower of a stock car competing the 1955 NASCAR Grand National season would be 230 horsepower (approximately 620 less horsepower than the vehicles used in the 2009 NASCAR Sprint Cup season).

The first race of the season was held at Tri-City Speedway in High Point, North Carolina, while the last race of the season was held at Orange Speedway in Hillsboro, North Carolina. During this time, it was customary for the majority of the tracks to be dirt tracks as 40 out of the 45 races were raced in that manner. Dirt track racing helped produce the lower speeds that kept the action safe decades prior to the Car of Tomorrow. The move to paved tracks in later decades would produce dangerous speeds that would cause research to move towards making cars safer to drive as opposed to making cars faster. There would be approximately 20 more years of dirt racing before paved oval racing would finally become the expected norm for NASCAR racing.

Races

Wilkes County 160

The 1955 Wilkes County 160 was a NASCAR Grand National (now Monster Energy NASCAR Cup Series) race that took place on April 3, 1955, at North Wilkesboro Speedway in the American community of North Wilkesboro, North Carolina.

One hundred and sixty laps were done on a dirt track spanning . The total duration of the race was one hour, twenty-two minutes, and three seconds with no cautions. Buck Baker defeated Dick Rathmann by three feet.

Top ten finishers
87 -  Buck Baker
3 -  Dick Rathmann
99 -  Curtis Turner
42 -  Lee Petty†
28 -  Eddie Skinner
98 -  Dave Terrell
5 -  Jimmie Lewallen
460 -  Gene Simpson
88 -  Joel Million
59 -  Blackie Pitt

1955-04 

The fourth race of the 1955 season was run on February 27 at the Daytona Beach Road Course in Daytona Beach, Florida. Tim Flock won the pole.

Top 10 Results
300- Tim Flock
42- Lee Petty
24- Ray Duhigg
99- Curtis Turner
14- Fonty Flock
82- Joe Eubanks
47- Dick Joslin
63- Bill Tanner
87- Buck Baker
185- Jack Radtke

1955-15
This race took place at Martinsville Speedway in Martinsville, Virginia, on May 15, 1955. Jim Paschal won the pole position at the speed of 58.823 miles per hour but Tim Flock won the race with one other vehicle on the lead lap (Lee Petty). Eleven thousand people attended the one-hour-and-fifty-four-minute race. The average speed of the race was 52.554 miles per hour.

Top 10 Results
300- Tim Flock
42- Lee Petty
55- Junior Johnson
88- Jimmie Lewallen
44- Bob Welborn
87- Buck Baker
121- Harvey Henderson
28- Eddie Skinner
78- Jim Paschal
71- Fred Dove

Richmond 200

The 1955 Richmond 200 was a NASCAR Grand National (now Monster Energy NASCAR Cup Series) race that took place on May 22, 1955, at Richmond Fairgrounds (now Richmond International Raceway) in the American community of Richmond, Virginia. Two hundred laps took place on a dirt track spanning . The exact time of the race was one hour, fifty minutes, and thirty seconds.

Qualifying was rained out so they had to draw for the pole position.

Top ten finishers
300 -  Tim Flock†
301 -  Fonty Flock†
42 -  Lee Petty†
78 -  Jim Paschal†
55 -  Junior Johnson†
44 -  Bob Welborn†
460 -  Gene Simpson
53 -  Elmo Langley†
69 -  Volney Schulze
11 -  George Parrish
† signifies that the driver is known to be deceased

1955 Mid-South 250

The 1955 Mid-South 250 is a NASCAR Grand National race that took place on August 14, 1955, at the Memphis-Arkansas Speedway in LeHi, Arkansas. Fifteen thousand people attended this race.

Top Ten Finishers
301- Fonty Flock
87- Speedy Thompson
300- Tim Flock
78- Jim Paschal
89- Buck Baker
44- Bob Welborn
55- Junior Johnson
14- Slick Smith
3- Jimmy Ayers
23- Ken Johns

Southern 500

The 1955 Southern 500 took place on September 5 at the Darlington Raceway in Darlington, South Carolina. Herb Thomas won that race while Fireball Roberts started out at the pole position. This race can be seen on DVDs showing classic stock cars of the 1950s and the 1960s. As one of the major stock cars race to take place prior to the 1959 Daytona 500, it was considered to be an honor to qualify for this race. Many locals would enter this race as an annual tradition and have their mechanics work on their cars for a month just for this race.

Top 10 Results
92- Herb Thomas
7- Jim Reed
16- Tim Flock
2- Gwyn Staley
96- Larry Flynn
89- Buck Baker
93- Lou Spears
70- Cotton Owens
25- Bill Widenhouse
04- Jimmy Massey

1955-42
This race took place at Martinsville Speedway in Martinsville, Virginia, on October 16, 1955. Speedy Thompson won the race but Gwyn Staley won the pole position by virtue of a drawing. The duration of the race was one hour and forty minutes.

Top 10 Results
30- Speedy Thompson
49- Bob Welborn
44- Jim Paschal
92- Herb Thomas
7- Jim Reed
9- Joe Weatherly
2- Gwyn Staley
42- Lee Petty
04- Jimmy Massey
87- Buck Baker

1955 LeHi 300

The 1955 LeHi 300 (known officially in NASCAR as 1955-40) was a NASCAR Grand National Series racing event that took place on October 9, 1955, at Memphis-Arkansas Speedway in the American community of LeHi, Arkansas.

NASCAR Cup Series beginners in this race included Johnny Allen, Bill Morton, Jim Murray, Norm Nelson, and Chuck Stevenson. A lot of drivers would make their grand exits from NASCAR after this race: this relatively long list included Floyd Curtis, Hooker Hood, Roscoe Rann and Leland Sewell. One-time race car drivers Bob Coleman, Al Hager, and Gene Rose would make their only NASCAR appearances during this race.

Top ten finishers
 297-Speedy Thompson
 98-Marvin Panch
 04-Jimmy Massey
 300-Tim Flock
 308-Bob Flock
 87-Buck Baker
 88-Jimmie Lewallen
 44-Ralph Liguori
 B29-Dink Widenhouse
 49-Bob Welborn

1955 Wilkes 160

The 1955 Wilkes 160 is a NASCAR Grand National race that took place on October 23, 1955, at the North Wilkesboro Speedway in North Wilkesboro, North Carolina. Buck Baker defeated Lee Petty by a time of three seconds. This race would produce Joe Weatherly's first finish in the top five.

Top 10 Results
87- Buck Baker
42- Lee Petty
2- Gwyn Staley
9- Joe Weatherly
300- Tim Flock
301- Fonty Flock
20- Speedy Thompson
B-29- Dink Widenhouse
198- Dave Terrell
44- Jim Paschal

1955-45
This race took place at Orange Speedway in Hillsboro, North Carolina, on October 16, 1955. Tim Flock both won the pole position at the speed of 81.673 miles per hour and won the race with five other vehicles on the lead lap. Six thousand people attended the one-hour-and-sixteen-minute race. The pole speed was recorded as 81.673 miles per hour while the average speed was 70.465 miles per hour.

Top 10 Results
301 - Tim Flock
99 - Curtis Turner
87 - Buck Baker
92 - Herb Thomas
198 - Dave Terrell
9 - Joe Weatherly
B-29 - Dink Widenhouse
2 - Gwyn Staley
04 - Jimmy Massey
44 - Bob Welborn

Season standings

Points
 Tim Flock - 9596
 Buck Baker - 8088
 Lee Petty - 7194
 Bob Welborn - 5460
 Herb Thomas - 5186
 Junior Johnson - 4810
 Eddie Skinner - 4652
 Jim Paschal - 4572
 Jimmie Lewallen - 4526
 Gwyn Staley - 4360
 Fonty Flock - 4266
 Dave Terrell - 3170
 Jimmy Massey - 2924
 Marvin Panch - 2812
 Speedy Thompson - 2452
 Jim Reed - 2416
 Gene Simpson - 2388
 Dick Rathmann - 2298
 Ralph Liguori - 2124
 Joe Eubanks - 2028
 Blackie Pitt - 1992
 Harvey Henderson - 1930
 Banks Simpson - 1852
 Dink Widenhouse - 1752
 John Dodd Jr. - 1496
 Bill Widenhouse - 1444
 Lou Spears - 1272
 Larry Flynn - 1260
 Cotton Owens - 1248
 Gordon Smith - 1212
 Billy Carden - 1172
 Arden Mounts - 1170
 Joe Million - 1136
 Curtis Turner - 1120
 John Lindsay - 1052
 Nace Mattingly - 992
 Bill Blair - 974
 Donald Thomas - 932
 Ed Cole - 924
 Mack Hanbury - 900
 Danny Letner - 892
 George Parish - 880
 Banjo Matthews - 860
 Carl Krueger - 748
 Ted Cannaday - 744
 Allen Adkins - 740
 Joe Weatherly - 724
 John McVitty - 684
 Lloyd Dane - 674
 Fred Dove - 668

Wins
 Tim Flock  - 18
 Lee Petty - 6
 Junior Johnson - 5
 Buck Baker - 3
 Herb Thomas - 3
 Jim Paschal - 3
 Fonty Flock - 3
 Speedy Thompson - 2
 Danny Letner - 1
 all others at 0 wins

Top 5 Finishes
 Tim Flock - 32
 Buck Baker - 24
 Lee Petty - 20
 Herb Thomas - 14
 Bob Welborn - 12
 Junior Johnson - 12
 Jim Paschal - 12
 Jimmie Lewallen - 8
 Gwyn Staley - 7
 Dick Rathmann - 7
 Eddie Skinner - 4
 Jimmy Massey - 4
 Marvin Panch - 4
 Jim Reed - 4
 Curtis Turner - 4
 Dave Terrell - 3
 Speedy Thompson - 3
 Don White - 3
 Billy Carden - 2
 Joe Million - 2
 Donald Thomas - 2
 Danny Letner - 2
 Allen Adkins - 2
 Gober Sosebee - 2
 Bill Amack - 2
 Fred Dove - 2
 Gene Simpson - 1
 Harvey Henderson - 1
 John Dodd Jr. - 1
 Bill Widenhouse - 1
 Larry Flynn - 1
 Cotton Owens - 1
 Nace Mattingly - 1
 Carl Krueger - 1
 Joe Weatherly - 1
 Lloyd Dane - 1
 Ray Duhigg - 1
 Bill Hyde - 1
 Bob Flock - 1
 John Kieper - 1
 Jack Choquette - 1
 Bill West - 1
 Norm Nelson - 1
 Clyde Palmer - 1
 all others at 0 top five finishes

References

 Racing Reference - 1955 Season Standings (Archived 2009-07-21)
 Racing Reference - 1955 Grand Nationals Results (Archived 2009-07-21)
 1955 Ford NASCAR Stock Car (Archived 2009-07-21)

 
NASCAR Cup Series seasons